Infant formula, baby formula, or simply formula (American English); or baby milk or infant milk (British English), is a manufactured food designed and marketed for feeding to babies and infants under 12 months of age, usually prepared for bottle-feeding or cup-feeding from powder (mixed with water) or liquid (with or without additional water). The U.S. Federal Food, Drug, and Cosmetic Act (FFDCA) defines infant formula as "a food which purports to be or is represented for special dietary use solely as a food for infants by reason of its simulation of human milk or its suitability as a complete or partial substitute for human milk".

Manufacturers state that the composition of infant formula is designed to be roughly based on a human mother's milk at approximately one to three months postpartum; however, there are significant differences in the nutrient content of these products. The most commonly used infant formulas contain purified cow's milk whey and casein as a protein source, a blend of vegetable oils as a fat source, lactose as a carbohydrate source, a vitamin-mineral mix, and other ingredients depending on the manufacturer. In addition, there are infant formulas using soybean as a protein source in place of cow's milk (mostly in the United States and Great Britain) and formulas using protein hydrolysed into its component amino acids for infants who are allergic to other proteins. An upswing in breastfeeding in many countries has been accompanied by a deferment in the average age of introduction of baby foods (including cow's milk), resulting in both increased breastfeeding and increased use of infant formula between the ages of 3- and 12-months.

A 2001 World Health Organization (WHO) report found that infant formula prepared in accordance with applicable Codex Alimentarius standards was a safe complementary food and a suitable breast milk substitute. In 2003, the WHO and UNICEF published their Global Strategy for Infant and Young Child Feeding, which restated that "processed-food products for...young children should, when sold or otherwise distributed, meet applicable standards recommended by the Codex Alimentarius Commission", and also warned that "lack of breastfeeding—and especially lack of exclusive breastfeeding during the first half-year of life—are important risk factors for infant and childhood morbidity and mortality".

In particular, the use of infant formula in less economically developed countries is linked to poorer health outcomes because of the prevalence of unsanitary preparation conditions, including lack of clean water and lack of sanitizing equipment. A formula-fed child living in unclean conditions is between 6 and 25 times more likely to die of diarrhea and four times more likely to die of pneumonia than a breastfed child. Rarely, use of powdered infant formula (PIF) has been associated with serious illness, and even death, due to infection with Cronobacter sakazakii and other microorganisms that can be introduced to PIF during its production. Although C. sakazakii can cause illness in all age groups, infants are believed to be at greatest risk of infection. Between 1958 and 2006, there have been several dozen reported cases of C. sakazakii infection worldwide. The WHO believes that such infections are under-reported.

Uses, risks and controversies

The use and marketing of infant formula has come under scrutiny. Breastfeeding, including exclusive breastfeeding for the first 6 months of life, is widely advocated as "ideal" for babies and infants, both by health authorities—and accordingly in ethical advertising of infant formula manufacturers.

Despite the recommendation that babies be exclusively breastfed for the first 6 months, less than 40% of infants below this age are exclusively breastfed worldwide. The overwhelming majority of American babies are not exclusively breastfed for this period—in 2005 under 12% of babies were breastfed exclusively for the first 6 months, with over 60% of babies of 2 months of age being fed formula, and approximately one in four breastfed infants having infant formula feeding within two days of birth.

Some studies have shown that use of formula can vary according to the parents' socio-economic status, ethnicity or other characteristics. For example, according to a research conducted in Vancouver, Canada, 82.9% of mothers breastfeed their babies at birth, but the number differed between Caucasians (91.6%) and non-Caucasians (56.8%), with the difference essentially attributed to marital status, education and family income. In the United States, mothers of lower socio-economic status have been found less likely to breastfeed, although this may be partly related to adverse effects of government nutrition supplementation programs that provide subsidies for infant formula.

The use of hydrolysed cow milk baby formula versus standard milk baby formula does not appear to change the risk of allergies or autoimmune diseases.

Use of infant formula

In some cases, breastfeeding is medically contraindicated. These include:
 Mother's health: The mother is infected with HIV or has active tuberculosis. She is extremely ill or has had certain kinds of breast surgery, which may have removed or disconnected all milk-producing parts of the breast. She is taking any kind of drug that could harm the baby, including both prescription drugs such as cytotoxic chemotherapy for cancer treatments as well as illicit drugs.
 One of the main global risks posed by breast milk specifically is the transmission of HIV and other infectious diseases. Breastfeeding by an HIV-infected mother poses a 5–20% chance of transmitting HIV to the baby. However, if a mother has HIV, she is more likely to transmit it to her child during the pregnancy or birth than during breastfeeding. A 2012 study conducted by researchers from the University of North Carolina School of Medicine showed reduced HIV-1 transmission in humanized mice, due to components in the breast milk. Cytomegalovirus infection poses potentially dangerous consequences for pre-term babies. Other risks include mother's infection with HTLV-1 or HTLV-2 (viruses that could cause T-cell leukemia in the baby), herpes simplex when lesions are present on the breasts, and chickenpox in the newborn when the disease manifested in the mother within a few days of birth. In some cases these risks can be mitigated by using heat-treated milk and nursing for a briefer time (e.g. 6 months, rather than 18–24 months), and can be avoided by using an uninfected woman's milk, as via a wet-nurse or milk bank, or by using infant formula and/or treated milk.
 In balancing the risks, such as cases where the mother is infected with HIV, a decision to use infant formula versus exclusive breastfeeding may be made based on alternatives that satisfy the “AFASS” (Acceptable, Feasible, Affordable, Sustainable and Safe) principles.
 Baby is unable to breastfeed: The child has a birth defect or inborn error of metabolism such as galactosemia that makes breastfeeding difficult or impossible.
Baby is considered at risk for malnutrition: In certain circumstances infants may be at risk for malnutrition, such as due to iron deficiency, vitamin deficiencies (e.g. vitamin D which may be less present in breast milk than needed at high latitudes where there is less sun exposure), or inadequate nutrition during transition to solid foods. Risks can often be mitigated with improved diet and education of mothers and caregivers, including availability of macro and micronutrients. For example, in Canada, marketed infant formulas are fortified with vitamin D, but Health Canada also recommends breastfed infants receive extra vitamin D in the form of a supplement.
 Personal preferences, beliefs, and experiences: The mother may dislike breast-feeding or find it inconvenient. In addition, breastfeeding can be difficult for victims of rape or sexual abuse; for example, it may be a trigger for posttraumatic stress disorder. Many families bottle feed to increase the father's role in parenting his child.
Mental health: The pressure to breastfeed in many cultures can be so much that the mother's mental health may take a sharp decline. This can have physical effects such as poor latching as well as milk depletion and a lack of connection to the child. In some cases it is better for the child to be formula fed so that a better bond can be made between mother and child rather than the ‘special bond’ that comes from breastfeeding being tainted by negative breastfeeding experiences. The pressure to breastfeed in many cultures can increase the likelihood of postpartum depression.
 Absence of the mother: The child is adopted, orphaned, abandoned, or in the sole custody of a man or male same-sex couple. The mother is separated from her child by being in prison or a mental hospital. The mother has left the child in the care of another person for an extended period of time, such as while traveling or working abroad.
 Food allergies: The mother eats foods that may provoke an allergic reaction in the infant.
 Financial pressures: Maternity leave is unpaid, insufficient, or lacking. The mother's employment interferes with breastfeeding. Mothers who breastfeed may experience a loss of earning power.
 Societal structure: Breastfeeding may be forbidden, discouraged or difficult at the mother's job, school, place of worship or in other public places, or the mother may feel that breastfeeding in these places or around other people is immodest, unsanitary, or inappropriate.
 Social pressures: Family members, such as mother's husband or boyfriend, or friends or other members of society may encourage the use of infant formula. For example, they may believe that breastfeeding will decrease the mother's energy, health, or attractiveness.   Conversely, societal pressures to breastfeed can also lead to mental health issues. A sense of shame from not being able to or struggling to do so equalling being a failure has a connection to Postpartum Depression 
 Lack of training and education: The mother lacks education and training from medical providers or community members.  
 Lactation insufficiency: The mother is unable to produce sufficient milk. In studies that do not account for lactation failure with obvious causes (such as use of formula and/or breast pumps), chronic lactation insufficiency affects around 10-15% of women. For about 5-8% of women, milk coming in (i.e., lactogenesis II) may not occur at all, and only drops are produced. Alternatively, despite a healthy supply, the woman or her family may incorrectly believe that her breast milk is of low quality or in low supply. These women may choose infant formula either exclusively or as a supplement to breastfeeding.  New research is showing that mothers who report problems with milk production have physical markers indicating low milk production, calling into question the assumption (called “perceived insufficient milk supply” or PIMS) that mothers are incorrect about the quantity of milk they are producing.
Fear of exposure to environmental contaminants: Certain environmental pollutants, such as polychlorinated biphenyls, can bioaccumulate in the food chain and may be found in humans including mothers' breast milk.
 However studies have shown that the greatest risk period for adverse effects from environmental exposures is prenatally. Other studies have further found that the levels of most persistent organohalogen compounds in human milk decreased significantly over the past three decades and equally did their exposure through breastfeeding.
Research on risks from chemical pollution is generally inconclusive in terms of outweighing the benefits of breastfeeding. Studies supported by the WHO and others have found that neurological benefits of breast milk remain, regardless of dioxin exposure. 
In developing countries, environmental contaminants associated with increased health risks from use of infant formula, particularly diarrhea due to unclean water and lack of sterile conditions – both prerequisites to the safe use of formula – often outweigh any risks from breastfeeding.
 Lack of other sources of breast milk:
 Lack of wet nurses: Wet nursing is illegal and stigmatized in some countries, and may not be available. It may also be socially unsupported, expensive, or health screening of wet nurses may not be available. The mother, her doctor, or family may not know that wet nursing is possible, or may believe that nursing by a relative or paid wet-nurse is unhygienic.
 Lack of milk banks: Human-milk banks may not be available, as few exist, and many countries cannot provide the necessary screening for diseases and refrigeration.

Health risks
Use of infant formula has been cited for association with numerous increased health risks. Studies have found infants in developed countries who consume formula are at increased risk for acute otitis media, gastroenteritis, severe lower respiratory tract infections, atopic dermatitis, asthma, obesity, type 1 and 2 diabetes, sudden infant death syndrome (SIDS), eczema and necrotizing enterocolitis when compared to infants who are breastfed. Some studies have found an association between infant formula and lower cognitive development, including iron supplementation in baby formula being linked to lowered I.Q. and other neurodevelopmental delays; however other studies have found no correlation. Causation, however, has not been established for negative long-term health effects of infant formula; studies analyzing health outcomes for breastfed vs. formula fed babies are primarily observational in nature and are plagued with confounding factors such as socioeconomic status, education level, and maternal preexisting conditions (such as obesity, which is associated with both low milk production and childhood obesity). When confounding factors are controlled for, differences between long-term health of breastfed and formula fed infants decrease.

Melamine contamination

In 2008, a case of melamine poisoning of infant formula was discovered in China, where milk was deliberately adulterated with the chemical, leading to the death of six babies, and illnesses in more than 300,000 infants, including cases of acute kidney failure. Large quantities of melamine were added to watered-down milk to give it the appearance of having adequate protein levels. Some of those responsible for the poisoning were sentenced to death.

In November 2008, traces of melamine were reported to have been found by the U.S. Food and Drug Administration in infant formula sold in the United States made by the three main American firms — Abbott Laboratories, Nestlé and Mead Johnson — responsible for 90–99% of the infant formula market in that country. The levels were much less than those reported in China, where levels of melamine contamination had reached as much as 2,500 parts per million, about 10,000 times higher than the recorded US levels. The safety data sheet for melamine (CAS registry number 108-78-1; C3-H6-N6) recorded the acute oral toxicity (median lethal dose) at 3161 mg/kg for a rat.

Health Canada conducted a separate test and also detected traces of melamine in infant formula available in Canada. The melamine levels were well below Health Canada's safety limits, although concerns remain about the safety of manufactured food for infants and monitoring of potentially dangerous substances.

Other health controversies
 In 1985, Syntex Corporation was ordered to pay $27 million in compensation for the deaths of two American infants who suffered brain damage after drinking the company's baby formula, called Neo-mull-soy. Formulas produced by Syntex had previously been subject to a major recall as they were found to have insufficient chloride to support normal infant growth and development.
 In 2003, baby plant-based formula manufactured by the German company Humana and sold in Israel under the brand Remedia caused severe vitamin deficiencies in babies. Babies who consumed the formula were hospitalized with cardiac and neurological symptoms. Three of them died, and at least twenty others were left with severe disabilities. An investigation revealed that the formula contained a much lower quantity of Thiamine than is needed for healthy infant development because of a manufacturing error. Humana's chief food technologist received a 30-month prison sentence for negligent manslaughter in February 2013 over the case.
 In 2010, Abbott Laboratories issued a voluntary recall of about five million Similac brand powder infant formulas that were sold in the United States, Guam, Puerto Rico and some Caribbean countries. The recall was issued after the presence of a 'small common beetle' was detected in the product.
In Canada, New Zealand and elsewhere, public concerns have been raised over the continued sale and marketing of soy-based formulae potentially containing high levels of phytoestrogens, linked to abnormal child development including damage to babies' thyroid glands.
In December 2011 Wal-Mart recalled a quantity of infant formula after a baby died in Missouri. "We extend our deepest condolences to this baby boy's family as they try to come to grips with their loss," said Dianna Gee, a Wal-Mart spokeswoman. "As soon as we heard what happened, we immediately reached out to the manufacturer of the formula and to the Department of Health and Senior Services to provide any information we may have to help with the investigation." Wal-Mart said it pulled a batch of Enfamil from its stores nationwide that matched the size and lot number ZP1k7G of the formula that may have sickened the baby in Missouri, Gee said. The baby formula was purchased from a Wal-Mart in Lebanon, Missouri. After the purchase, a 10-day-old infant died from a rare bacterial infection, CNN affiliate KYTV reported. Authorities ran tests to determine if the death came from the formula, the water to make the formula or any other factor, said Mead Johnson Nutrition, the company that makes Enfamil. "We are highly confident in the safety and quality of our products – and the rigorous testing we put them through," said Chris Perille, a Mead Johnson Nutrition spokesman.[Source CNN]

Preparation and content

Variations
Infant formulas come in powder, liquid concentrate, and ready-to-feed forms. They are designed to be prepared by the parent or caregiver in small batches and fed to the infant, usually with either a cup or a baby bottle.

Infant formulas come in a variety of types:
Cow's milk formula is the most commonly used type. The milk has been altered to resemble breast milk. 
Soy protein based formulas are frequently used for infants allergic to cow's milk or lactose. Soy-based formulas can also be useful if the parent wants to exclude animal proteins from the child's diet.
Protein hydrolysate formulas contain protein that's been broken down into smaller sizes than are those in cow's milk and soy-based formulas. Protein hydrolysate formulas are meant for babies who do not tolerate cow's milk or soy-based formulas. 
Specialized formulas are also available for premature infants and those with specific medical conditions.

Manufacturers and health officials advise it is very important to measure powders or concentrates accurately to achieve the intended final product concentration; otherwise, the child will be malnourished. It is advisable that all equipment that comes into contact with the infant formula be cleaned and sterilized before each use. Proper refrigeration is essential for any infant formula which is prepared in advance.

In developing countries, formula is frequently prepared improperly, resulting in high infant mortality due to malnutrition and diseases such as diarrhea and pneumonia. This is due to lack of clean water, lack of sterile conditions, lack of refrigeration, illiteracy (so written instructions cannot be followed), poverty (diluting formula so that it lasts longer), and lack of education of mothers by formula distributors. These problems and resulting disease and death are a key factor in opposition to the marketing and distribution of infant formula in developing countries by numerous public health agencies and NGOs (discussed in more detail at Nestlé boycott and International Code of Marketing of Breast-milk Substitutes).

Nutritional content
Besides breast milk, infant formula is the only other milk product which the medical community considers nutritionally acceptable for infants under the age of one year (as opposed to cow's milk, goat's milk, or follow-on formula). Supplementing with solid food in addition to breast milk or formula begins during weaning, and most babies begin supplementing about the time their first teeth appear, usually around the age of six months.

Although cow's milk is the basis of almost all infant formula, plain cow's milk is unsuited for infants because of its high casein content and low whey content, and untreated cow's milk is not recommended before the age of 12 months. The infant intestine is not properly equipped to digest non-human milk, and this may often result in diarrhea, intestinal bleeding and malnutrition. To reduce the negative effect on the infant's digestive system, cow's milk used for formula undergoes processing to be made into infant formula. This includes steps to make protein more easily digestible and alter the whey-to-casein protein balance to one closer to human milk, the addition of several essential ingredients (often called "fortification", see below), the partial or total replacement of dairy fat with fats of vegetable or marine origin, etc.

The nutrient content of infant formula for sale in the United States is regulated by the Food and Drug Administration (FDA) based on recommendations by the American Academy of Pediatrics Committee on Nutrition. The following must be included in all formulas produced in the U.S.:
Protein
Fat
Linoleic acid
Vitamins: A, C, D, E, K, thiamin (B1), riboflavin (B2), B6, B12
Niacin
Folic acid
Pantothenic acid
Calcium
Minerals: magnesium, iron, zinc, manganese, copper
Phosphorus
Iodine
Sodium chloride
Potassium chloride
Carbohydrates
Carbohydrates are an important source of energy for growing infants, as they account for 35 to 42% of their daily energy intake. In most cow's milk-based formulas, lactose is the main source of carbohydrates present, but lactose is not present in cow's milk-based lactose-free formulas nor specialized non-milk protein formulas or hydrolyzed protein formulas for infants with milk protein sensitivity. Lactose is also not present in soy-based formulas. Therefore, those formulas without lactose will use other sources of carbohydrates, such as sucrose and glucose, dextrins, and natural and modified starches. Lactose is not only a good source of energy, it also aids in the absorption of the minerals magnesium, calcium, zinc and iron.
Human milk oligosaccharides (HMOs)
HMOs are naturally occurring sugars found in human breast milk, they improve the immune system and act as nutrients to beneficial gut bacteria. Some manufacturers also use human milk oligosaccharides as a modern infant formula supplement to give additional health benefits to their products, however they are not found all types of formula.
Nucleotides
 Nucleotides are compounds found naturally in human breast milk. They are involved in critical metabolic processes, such as energy metabolism and enzymatic reactions. Also, as the building blocks of deoxyribonucleic acid (DNA) and ribonucleic acid (RNA), they are essential for normal body functions. Compared to human breast milk, cow's milk has lower levels of the nucleotides uridine, inosine, and cytidine. Therefore, several companies that produce infant formula have added nucleotides to their infant formulas.

Other commonly used ingredients:
Emulsifiers and stabilizers: Ingredients added to prevent the separation of the oil from the water (and its soluble components) in the infant formula. Some commonly used emulsifiers include monoglycerides, diglycerides, and gums.
Diluents: Skim milk is commonly used as the primary diluent in milk-based liquid formula to provide the bulk of the volume. In contrast, purified water is the most commonly used diluent in milk-free formulations.

Policy, industry and marketing
The policy, regulatory and industry environments surrounding the infant formula market vary tremendously between countries.

International

The International Code of Marketing of Breast-milk Substitutes is an international health policy framework adopted by the World Health Assembly of the WHO in 1981 regarding infant formula marketing, including strict restrictions on advertising. Its implementation depends on the laws of different countries and the behavior of infant formula manufacturers – the code has no power itself. Legislation and corporate behavior vary significantly between countries: at least 84 countries have enacted national legislation implementing all or many of the provisions of the Code and 14 countries have draft laws awaiting adoption; whereas elsewhere neither the Code nor its principles are followed by governments or formula manufacturers.

Practices that are banned in the Code include most advertising, claiming health benefits for formula, and giving free samples to women able to breastfeed – this latter practice is particularly criticized because it can interfere with lactation, creating dependence on formula, without proper education on ensuring continued breast stimulation while formula is being used. In many countries free samples of infant formula have been provided to hospitals for decades; infant formula is often the only product routinely provided free of charge to hospitals. The Baby Friendly Hospital Initiative (BFHI) aims to reduce and eliminate this controversial practice; however, there is increasing criticism of the BFHI's rigidity in limiting use of infant formula, which can be an appropriate treatment for common conditions such as suboptimal intake jaundice, and may cause mothers to feel pressured or guilted into breastfeeding.

By country

Philippines
Infant formula is one of the top three consumer commodities in the Philippines, and among the most imported products. Annual sales amount to some US$469 million annually. US$88 million is spent on advertising the product.

Infant formula marketing has been regulated since the 1987 Executive Order 51 or "Milk Code", which regulated, but did not ban, practices such as advertising and providing free samples. Shortly after it was enacted, Wyeth introduced "follow-on formula", which was not in the purview of the Milk Code which predated its market entry.

In 2006, the Department of Health banned the advertising of infant formula and the practice of providing free samples, regardless of intended age group (in the Revised Implementing Rules and Regulations of Executive Order 51, or RIRR). The new regulation was challenged by the infant formula industry in the Supreme Court. Initially the challenge was dismissed, but this decision was reversed following industry pressure and a controversial letter by American business leader Thomas Donahue, then President and CEO of the US Chamber of Commerce, resulting in the regulation being suspended and advertising continuing.
 
The Guardian newspaper reports widespread illegal advertising and marketing of formula milk contrary to World Health Organization guidelines. Doctors and midwives are encouraged to promote feeding babies formula milk, advertising also targets mothers directly. Babies get sick and sometimes die because poor mothers cannot sterilize bottles.

South Africa 
In South Africa, there is a move towards plain packaging of infant formula under R 991 of the Foodstuffs, Cosmetics and Disinfectants Act; as of 6 December 2013, Regulation 7 (Sale and Promotion) is force, whereas Regulations 2-6 (primarily with respect to labelling) are scheduled to come into force on 6 December 2014.
One of the key requirements as per Regulation 3.1.A.iii is a conspicuous message stating “[t]his product shall only be used on the advice of a health professional”.

United Kingdom 
In the United Kingdom, infant formula advertising has been allowed since 1995; advertising for "follow-on formula" is legal, which has been cited as a loophole allowing advertising of similarly packaged formula.

United States 

In the United States, infant formula is both heavily marketed—the country has not adopted the Code, nor is it being systematically implemented by manufacturers for domestic marketing—and even heavily subsidized by the government: at least one third of the American market is supported by the government, with over half of infant formula sold in the country provided through the Special Supplemental Nutrition Program for Women, Infants, and Children (known as WIC).

According to surveys, over 70% of large U.S. hospitals dispense infant formula to all infants, a practice opposed by the American Academy of Pediatrics and in violation of the Code. The Gerber Products Company began marketing its brand of infant formula directly to the public in October 1989, while the Carnation Company began marketing Good Start infant formula directly to the public in January 1991.

Infant formula costs are a significant fraction of the WIC program costs: 21% post-rebate and 46% pre-rebate. Formula manufacturers are granted a WIC monopoly in individual states. Meanwhile, breastfeeding rates are substantially lower for WIC recipients; this is partly attributed to formula being free of charge to mothers in the WIC program, who are of lower socio-economic status. Violations of federal policy have also been found in terms of infant formula company advertising using the WIC trademark, to reach both WIC and non-WIC participants. In recent years WIC has been expanding its breastfeeding promotion strategies, including providing subsidies for clients who use milk banks.

2022 United States Baby Formula Shortages 

Supply chain disruptions related to the government response to the COVID-19 pandemic in the United States have been reported as responsible for causing widespread shortages of infant formula in the United States, as of May 2022. This contrasts with far less severe shortages of infant formula around the globe. Reason magazine reported that this was largely the result of Food and Drug Administration (FDA) processes delaying approval of otherwise safe infant formula from Europe or other sources abroad, which might otherwise have eased demand for infant formula tensions in the United States.

As a result of the shortages, on May 16, 2022, the FDA announced that it would temporarily ease enforcement of some labeling rules to allow the importation of foreign formulas. FDA Commissioner Robert Califf stated, "Today's action paves the way for companies who don't normally distribute their infant formula products in the U.S. to do so efficiently and safely. We anticipate that those products that can quickly meet safety and nutrition standards could hit U.S. stores in a matter of weeks." Former FDA associate commissioner, Peter Pitts, asserts that the FDA's regulatory scheme is at least partially to blame for the shortage. Pitts states, "The difference between European baby formula and American baby formula, more or less, is that the labeling is different. The knot in getting that product into the U.S. isn't safety, it's a regulatory issue. I don't want to say it's a nitty issue, but it's certainly something the FDA could have jumped on a lot quicker."

Amid and prior to the formula shortages, Woman and Infant Children (WIC) centers in Georgia and North Carolina were disposing of infant formula.   This was done under the USDA's recommendation that unused, returned WIC infant formula were to be disposed of upon return. Despite an attempt by the USDA to walk back this recommendation by stating that it is a recommendation rather than a requirement, the USDA confirms that it will not reverse this recommendation, even amid the formula shortage. As a result, from October 2021 through May 2022, 16,459 cans of baby formula were destroyed by WIC clinics in Georgia and an unknown amount of baby formula cans were destroyed in North Carolina and other US States.

On July 6, 2022, the FDA announced that it would change its rules to allow foreign formula manufacturers to permanently import their goods into the U.S., potentially reducing the severity of the shortage. Critics of the FDA note that this does not remove the regulations entirely and that this shortage has been self-imposed by the FDA from the start. Additionally, critics note that if a formula maker passes EU regulations, this should be good enough for the FDA to allow importation of that formula.

Critics of the FDA's regulatory policy note that the regulatory scheme surrounding European formulas is not borne from a science-based desire to protect children, but rather an influence that the US dairy industry has on the agency.  Critics also note that if there were an issue with European formulas, the issue would be widespread among the European babies that regularly consume the formula.

The FORMULA Act is set to expire at the end of 2022, which will subsequently reinstate tariffs on foreign made formula.  Experts worry that this will result in a repeat formula shortage for 2023. The CEO of the National Milk Producers Federation, a lobbying organization for dairy producers, wrote in a letter to Congress and the Biden Administration to allow for the reinstatement of tariffs on foreign baby formula to commence.

History
The Wabanaki and other Native American tribal nations of North America made an infant formula from nuts and cornmeal. Elizabeth Hanson was captured by Wabanaki in 1725 and a Native American woman showed Hanson how to make this infant formula and she included this in her captivity narrative.

Early infant foods
In 1865, the first infant food was invented.
Throughout history, mothers who could not breastfeed their babies either employed a wet nurse or, less frequently, prepared food for their babies, a process known as "dry nursing". Baby food composition varied according to region and economic status. In Europe and North America during the early 19th century, the prevalence of wet nursing began to decrease, while the practice of feeding babies mixtures based on animal milk rose in popularity.   This trend was driven by cultural changes as well as increased sanitation measures, and it continued throughout the 19th and much of the 20th century, with a notable increase after Elijah Pratt invented and patented the India-rubber nipple in 1845. As early as 1846, scientists and nutritionists noted an increase in medical problems and infant mortality was associated with dry nursing. In an attempt to improve the quality of manufactured baby foods, in 1867, Justus von Liebig developed the world's first commercial infant formula, Liebig's Soluble Food for Babies. The success of this product quickly gave rise to competitors such as Mellin's Food, Ridge's Food for Infants and Nestlé's Milk.

Raw milk formulas
As physicians became increasingly concerned about the quality of such foods, medical recommendations such as Thomas Morgan Rotch's "percentage method" (published in 1890) began to be distributed, and gained widespread popularity by 1907. These complex formulas recommended that parents mix cow's milk, water, cream, and sugar or honey in specific ratios to achieve the nutritional balance believed to approximate human milk reformulated in such a way as to accommodate the believed digestive capability of the infant.

At the dawn of the 20th century in the United States, most infants were breastfed, although many received some formula feeding as well. Home-made "percentage method" formulas were more commonly used than commercial formulas in both Europe and the United States. They were less expensive and were widely believed to be healthier. However, formula-fed babies exhibited more diet-associated medical problems, such as scurvy, rickets and bacterial infections than breastfed babies. By 1920, the incidence of scurvy and rickets in formula-fed babies had greatly decreased through the addition of orange juice and cod liver oil to home-made formulas. Bacterial infections associated with formula remained a problem more prevalent in the United States than in Europe, where milk was usually boiled prior to use in formulas.

Evaporated milk formulas
In the 1920s and 1930s, evaporated milk began to be widely commercially available at low prices, and several clinical studies in the period suggested that babies fed evaporated milk formula thrived as well as breastfed babies.

These studies, accompanied by the affordable price of evaporated milk and the availability of the home icebox initiated a tremendous rise in the use of evaporated milk formulas. By the late 1930s, the use of evaporated milk formulas in the United States surpassed all commercial formulas, and by 1950 over half of all babies in the United States were reared on such formulas.

Commercial formulas
In parallel with the enormous shift (in industrialized nations) away from breastfeeding to home-made formulas, nutrition scientists continued to analyze human milk and attempted to make infant formulas that more closely matched its composition. Maltose and dextrins were believed nutritionally important, and in 1912, the Mead Johnson Company released a milk additive called Dextri-Maltose. This formula was made available to mothers only by physicians. In 1919, milkfats were replaced with a blend of animal and vegetable fats as part of the continued drive to closer simulate human milk. This formula was called SMA for "simulated milk adapted."

In the late 1920s, Alfred Bosworth released Similac (for "similar to lactation"), and Mead Johnson released Sobee. Several other formulas were released over the next few decades, but commercial formulas did not begin to seriously compete with evaporated milk formulas until the 1950s. The reformulation and concentration of Similac in 1951, and the introduction (by Mead Johnson) of Enfamil (for "infant milk") in 1959 were accompanied by marketing campaigns that provided inexpensive formula to hospitals and pediatricians. By the early 1960s, commercial formulas were more commonly used than evaporated milk formulas in the United States, which all but vanished in the 1970s. By the early 1970s, over 75% of American babies were fed on formulas, almost entirely commercially produced.

When birth rates in industrial nations tapered off during the 1960s, infant formula companies heightened marketing campaigns in non-industrialized countries. Unfortunately, poor sanitation led to steeply increased mortality rates among infants fed formula prepared with contaminated water. Additionally, a WHO has cited over-diluting formula preparations as resulting in infant malnourishment. Organized protests, the most famous of which was the Nestlé boycott of 1977, called for an end to unethical marketing. This boycott is ongoing, as the current coordinators maintain that Nestlé engages in marketing practices which violate the International Code of Marketing of Breast-milk Substitutes.

Generic brand formulas
In addition to commercially marketed brands, generic brands (or store brands) of infant formula were introduced in the United States in 1997, first by PBM Products. These private label formulas are sold by many leading food and drug retailers such as Wal-Mart, Target, Kroger, Loblaws, and Walgreens. All infant formula brands in the United States are required to adhere to the Food and Drug Administration (FDA) guidelines. As reported by the Mayo Clinic: “as with most consumer products, brand-name infant formulas cost more than generic brands. But that doesn't mean that brand-name [Similac, Nestle, Enfamil] formulas are better. Although manufacturers may vary somewhat in their formula recipes, the FDA requires that all formulas contain the same nutrient density.”

Similarly, in Canada all infant formulas regardless of brand are required to meet standards set by Health Canada.

Follow-on and toddler formulas
Follow-on or toddler formulas are sold for ages 6 months to 3 years (when infants are typically breastfed). In the US, a transition formula is marketed for children from age 9 to 24 months, and a toddler milk is sold for children age 12 to 26 months. In both cases, the ingredients are powdered milk, corn syrup and other added sugars, vegetable oil, and salt.

Toddler formulas are not nutritionally complete, nor are they subject to the same regulations or food labeling laws as infant formula. Critics have argued that follow-on and toddler formulas were introduced to circumvent the regulations regarding infant formula and have resulted in confusing advertising.

An early example of follow-on formula was introduced by Wyeth in the Philippines in 1987, following the introduction in this country of regulations on infant formula advertising, but which did not address follow-on formulas (products that did not exist at the time of their drafting). Similarly, while infant formula advertising is illegal in the United Kingdom, follow-on formula advertising is legal, and the similar packaging and market results in follow-on advertisements frequently being interpreted as advertisements for formula. (See also industry and marketing, below.)

These products have also recently fallen under criticism for contributing to the childhood obesity epidemic in some developed countries due to their marketing and flavoring practices. The drinks are also expensive. Although usually not quite as expensive as infant formula, they can cost four times the price of cow's milk.

Usage since 1970s
Since the early 1970s, industrial countries have witnessed a resurgence in breastfeeding among newborns and infants to 6 months of age. This upswing in breastfeeding has been accompanied by a deferment in the average age of introduction of other foods (such as cow's milk), resulting in increased use of both breastfeeding and infant formula between the ages of 3–12 months.

The global infant formula market has been estimated at $7.9 billion, with North America and Western Europe accounting for 33% of the market and considered largely saturated, and Asia representing 53% of the market. South East Asia is a particularly large fraction of the world market relative to its population. Infant formula is the largest segment of the baby food market, with the fraction given as between 40% and 70%.

Leading health organizations (e.g. WHO, U.S. Centers for Disease Control and Department of Health and Human Services) are attempting to reduce the use of infant formula and increase the prevalence of breastfeeding from birth through 12 to 24 months of age through public health awareness campaigns. The specific goals and approaches of these breastfeeding promotion programs, and the policy environment surrounding their implementation, vary by country. As a policy basic framework, the International Code of Marketing of Breast-milk Substitutes, adopted by the WHO's World Health Assembly in 1981, requires infant formula companies to preface their product information with statements that breastfeeding is the best way of feeding babies and that a substitute should only be used after consultation with health professionals. The Baby Friendly Hospital Initiative (BFHI) also restricts use by hospitals of free formula or other infant care aids provided by formula companies. (See also Policy section below.) While the Code was intended to restrict inappropriate marketing of infant formula, not access to it, parents have complained of being lectured or made to sign waivers implying formula would harm their babies in BFHI hospitals.

Infant formula processing

History

Current general procedure 
The manufacturing process may differ for different types of formula made; therefore the following is the general procedure for liquid-milk based formulas:

Mixing ingredients 
Primary ingredients are blended in large stainless steel tanks and skim milk is added and adjusted to 60 °C. Then, fats, oils and emulsifiers are added. Additional heating and mixing may be required to get proper consistency. Next, minerals, vitamins, and stabilizing gums are added at various points, depending on their sensitivity to heat. The batch is temporarily stored and then transported by pipelines to pasteurization equipment when mixing is complete.

Pasteurization 
This is a process that protects against spoilage by eliminating bacteria, yeasts and molds.
It involves quickly heating and then cooling of the product under controlled conditions which micro-organisms cannot survive. The batch is held at around 85–94 °C for approximately 30 seconds which is necessary to adequately reduce micro-organisms and prepare the formula for filling.

Homogenization 
This is a process which increases emulsion uniformity and stability by reducing size of fat and oil particles in the formula. It is done with a variety of mixing equipment that applies shear to the product and this mixing breaks fat and oil particles into very small droplets.

Standardization 
Standardization is used to ensure that the key parameters like pH, fat concentration and vitamins and mineral content are correct. If insufficient levels of these are found, the batch is reworked to achieve appropriate levels. After this step, the batch is ready to be packaged.

Packaging 
Packaging depends on manufacturer and type of equipment used, but in general, liquid formula is filled into metal cans with lids crimped into place.

Heat treatment or sterilization 
Finally, infant formulas are heat treated to maintain the bacteriologic quality of the product. This can be done traditionally by either retort sterilization or high-temperature short-time (HTST) treatment. Recently, ultrahigh-temperature treated formula has become more commonly used. If powdered formula is made, then spray drying would be required in addition. Retort sterilization is a traditional retort sterilization method that uses 10-15mins treatment at 118 °C. Ultrahigh-temperature (UHT) is a method that uses a brief (2–3 seconds) treatment at 142 °C. Because of the short time used, there is little protein denaturation, but the process still ensures sterility of the final product.

Recent and future potential new ingredients

Probiotics 
Randomized, controlled trials completed in the 2000s have shown limited and short term clinical benefits for the use of probiotics in infants’ diet. A 2018 clinical study using the multistrain De Simone Formulation probiotic showed it helped some infants reduce symptoms of infant colic.  The safety of probiotics in general and in infants, especially preterm infants, has been investigated in a limited number of controlled trials. The findings thus far suggest probiotics are generally safe, though the research is preliminary and has yet to provide definitive conclusions.

Prebiotics 
Prebiotics are undigestible carbohydrates that promote the growth of probiotic bacteria in the gut. Human milk contains a variety of oligosaccharides believed to be an important factor in the pattern of microflora colonization of breastfed infants. Because of variety, variability, complexity and polymorphism of the oligosaccharide composition and structure, it is currently not feasible to reproduce the oligosaccharide components of human milk in a strictly structural fashion.

The European Society of Pediatric Gastroenterology, Hepatology, and Nutrition Committee on Nutrition found evidence to support short term effects of ingesting prebiotics on stool microflora of infants with increased in the number of bifidobacteria. Babies can be at risk of dehydration with the induction of softer stools, if they have the kidney immaturity and/or a poor ability to concentrate urine. A reduction of pathogens has been associated with the consumption of prebiotics. However, there was no evidence to support major clinical or long-term benefits. Therefore, there is little evidence of beneficial effects of prebiotics in dietary products.

Lysozyme and lactoferrin 
Lysozyme is an enzyme that is responsible for protecting the body by damaging bacterial cell walls. Lactoferrin is a globular, multifunctional protein that has antimicrobial activity. Compared to human milk, cow's milk has a signifactly lower levels of lysozyme and lactoferrin; therefore, the industry has an increasing interest in adding them into infant formulas.

Long chain polyunsaturated fatty acid supplementation
Some manufacturers have begun supplementing formula milk with long-chain polyunsaturated fatty acids (LCPUFA). The current evidence suggests that there may be little or no difference between formula milk with and without LCPUFA supplementation in terms of babies' visual function, physical growth or neurodevelopment.

See also 
 2022 United States infant formula shortage
 2008 Chinese milk scandal
 Baby food
 Baby bottle
 Breastfeeding
 Breast milk
 Child development
 Daigou
 Dairy allergy
 List of dairy products

Notes

References

Further reading
 Ahern, Grace J., et al. "Advances in infant formula science." Annual review of food science and technology 10 (2019): 75-102. online
 Almeida, Cristine Couto, et al. "Bioactive compounds in infant formula and their effects on infant nutrition and health: a systematic literature review." International journal of food science 2021 (2021) online.

 Guo, Mingruo, ed. Human milk biochemistry and infant formula manufacturing technology (2020). online

 Hastings, Gerard, et al. "Selling second best: how infant formula marketing works." Globalization and Health 16.1 (2020): 1-12. online

 Martin, Camilia R., Pei-Ra Ling, and George L. Blackburn. "Review of infant feeding: key features of breast milk and infant formula." Nutrients 8.5 (2016): 279+ online. 

 Rosenberg, Alyssa. "The U.S. should never have another baby formula shortage" Washington Post Oct 6, 2022

External links 

FDA 101: Infant Formula
"Breast-feeding and Guilt: Interview with a Mayo Clinic Specialist"
Infant and Toddler Nutrition

 
Milk
Dairy products
Soy products
Bristol Myers Squibb
Breast milk
Breastfeeding